The Rise of the Tang Empire is a Chinese television series based on the events in the Zhenguan era during the reign of Emperor Taizong of the Tang dynasty. The 50 episodes long series is directed by Zhang Jianya and written by Ah Cheng and Meng Xianshi. It was first broadcast on BTV in China in December 2006.

Cast

 Ma Yue as Emperor Taizong of Tang
 Chin Shih-chieh as Wei Zheng
 Ma Shaohua as Zhangsun Wuji
 Miao Pu as Empress Zhangsun
 Ma Jingwu as Emperor Gaozu of Tang
 Lu Jianmin as Li Jiancheng
 Shen Mengsheng as Li Yuanji
 Ge Zhijun as Pei Ji
 Sun Ning as Fang Xuanling
 Zhu Lei as Du Ruhui
 Wu Jian as Li Jing
 Lü Xing as Li Chengqian
 Wang Dongfang as Li Tai
 Hu Wenbao as Emperor Gaozong of Tang
 Tao Feifei / Tao Rong as Princess Gaoyang
 Zhang Di as Wu Zetian
 Qi Qianjun as Zhang Jieyu
 Serina Liu as Pipa Lady
 Zhao Wanyi as Hong Fu Nü
 Sun Yifei as Princess Wencheng
 Li Jiayi as Consort Yang
 Tu Ling as Wei Zheng's wife
 Zhang Yang as Chengxin
 Zang Jinsheng as Dou Jiande
 Li Zhenqi as Wei Ting
 Yan Hongzhi as Tuli Khan
 Han Dong as Illig Qaghan
 Fan Xiaoyang as Xuanzang
 Chen Zhihui as Qin Shubao
 Jia Shitou as Cheng Yaojin
 Zheng Tianyong as Li Gang
 Deli Ge'er as Yuchi Gong
 Jia Lin as Li Wu
 Han Yingqun as Li Sixing
 Li Qi as Li Shiji
 Wang Rong as Hou Junji
 Liu Weiming as Chu Suiliang
 Cui Kefa as Gao Shilian
 Yu Bin as Xiao Yi
 Wang Xiuqiang as Wang Gui
 Hao Zi as Helan Chushi
 Ye Peng as Fang Yi'ai
 Ji Yao as Zhang Gongjin
 Ma Siqian as Attendant Liu
 Wang Xinmin as Ma Zhou
 Xiahou Bin as Li Chunfeng
 Ye Xiaojian as Xiao Yu
 Hong Zongyi as Zhangsun Anye
 Guo Hongjie as Zhishi Sili
 Zhang Shaorong as Qu Wentai
 Yang Junyong as Tang Jian
 Ji Chunjiang as Li Xiaochang
 Jiang Houli as Yuwen Shiji
 Guo Wenxue as Xunxiang
 Jia Yuntong as Feng Deyi
 Cui Yugui as Li Daliang
 Yao Jinfei as Qu Zhisheng
 Liu Jinsheng as Qu Zhizhan
 Ma Xiaoning as Zhao Deyan
 Guo Zhenming as Royal Father-in-law Zhang
 Wang Ming as Wang Shichong
 Sui Hui as Ashina Ju
 Xu Junben as Yin Longda
 Zhu Yuanhao as Wang Wan
 Zhao Yulin as Zhang Xuansu
 Li Ping as Cen Wenben
 Wang Yingqi as Liu Heita
 Nige Mutu as Xue Wanche
 Zhen Liqiang as Luo Yi
 Zhang Xinyue as announcing official
 Meng Qingfan as inspecting official
 Tong Zhongqi as Bianji

See also
 Carol of Zhenguan

External links
  The Rise of the Tang Empire on Sina.com

2006 Chinese television series debuts
Television series set in the Tang dynasty
Mandarin-language television shows
Chinese historical television series
Cultural depictions of Emperor Taizong of Tang
Works by Ah Cheng
Television series set in the 7th century